Carlos Alberto Calvo (born 13 October 1994) is a Colombian artistic gymnast.

In 2015, he won the bronze medal in the men's artistic team all-around event at the 2015 Pan American Games held in Toronto, Canada. In 2018, he won three bronze medals at the 2018 Pacific Rim Gymnastics Championships held in Medellín, Colombia.

In 2019, he represented Colombia at the 2019 Pan American Games held in Lima, Peru and he won the bronze medal in the men's pommel horse event.

References

External links 
 

Living people
1994 births
Place of birth missing (living people)
Colombian male artistic gymnasts
Gymnasts at the 2015 Pan American Games
Gymnasts at the 2019 Pan American Games
Pan American Games bronze medalists for Colombia
Pan American Games medalists in gymnastics
Medalists at the 2015 Pan American Games
Medalists at the 2019 Pan American Games
21st-century Colombian people